Lithophane pertorrida is a species of cutworm or dart moth in the family Noctuidae. It is found in North America.

The MONA or Hodges number for Lithophane pertorrida is 9912.

References

Further reading

 
 
 

pertorrida
Articles created by Qbugbot
Moths described in 1942